The Leinster GAA Hurling All-Ireland Under-20 Championship known simply as the Leinster Under-20 Championship, is an annual inter-county hurling competition organised by the Leinster Council of the Gaelic Athletic Association (GAA). It is the highest inter-county hurling competition for male players between the ages of 17 and 20 in the province of Leinster. The championship was contested as the Leinster Under-21 Championship between 1964 and 2018 before changing to an under-20 age category from 2019. It is sponsored by Bord Gáis Energy.

The series of games are played during the summer months with the Leinster final currently being played in July. The prize for the winning team is the Seán Robbins Cup. The championship has always been played on a straight knock-out basis whereby once a team loses they are eliminated from the series.

The Leinster Championship is an integral part of the wider All-Ireland Under-20 Hurling Championship. The winners and runners-up of the Leinster final, like their counterparts in the Munster Championship, advance to the semi-final stage of the All-Ireland series of games.

Eight teams currently participate in the Munster Championship. Kilkenny is the most successful team with 26 titles, followed by Wexford with 17 titles. The title has been won by six different teams, four of whom have won the title more than once.

Galway are the current holders.

History

Creation

The Leinster Championship began in 1964 in response to a Congress motion put forward by the Kerry County Board for the introduction of a new championship grade. It was the fifth championship to be created after the senior, junior, minor and intermediate grades.

Beginnings

The inaugural Leinster Championship featured Carlow, Dublin, Kildare, Kilkenny, Laois, Louth, Offaly, Westmeath and Wexford. Louth and Westmeath contested the very first match on Sunday 29 March 1964. Wexford won the inaugural championship.

Team dominance

Since the beginning the championship has been dominated by Kilkenny and Wexford. They won all bar one of the available championship titles between 1964 and 1977 and have won a combined total of 42 championship titles. Kilkenny also have the distinction of being the only team to win four championships in-a-row, achieving this feat on two separate occasions.

Dublin were the only team beside Kilkenny and Wexford to win the championship, with their lone title being claimed in 1967. Offaly and Laois added their names to the roll of honour in 1978 and 1983 respectively, however, the rest of the century belonged to Kilkenny and Wexford once again.

Proposed changes

In 2008 a motion was brought before a special Congress in an effort to combat player burnout. It was proposed to merge the existing under-21 and minor championships to create a new Leinster Under-19 Hurling Championship based on the provincial system. This motion was defeated by 115 votes to 58.

A similar motion was later introduced in an effort to lower the age and create a new Leinster Under-20 Championship based on the provincial system, however, this motion was also defeated.

Age change

At the GAA Congress on 24 February 2018, the age limit of the championship was changed to twenty, following a successful motion by the Offaly County Board. In contrast to Gaelic football, under-20 hurlers are eligible to play both under-20 and senior hurling for their county.

Current format

Championship

The Leinster Championship is a knockout tournament with pairings drawn at random. Each match is played as a single leg. If a match is drawn there is a period of extra time, however, if the sides still remain level a replay is required.

There are nine teams in the Leinster Championship. The finalists from the previous year receive a bye to separate semi-finals. The four "weakest" teams contest two play-off rounds with the winner joining the other three teams in the championship proper at the quarter-final stage.

Qualification for the All-Ireland Championship

As of the 2018 championship qualification for the All-Ireland Championship has changed due to the introduction of a "back door" for defeated finalists. Both the champions and runners-up qualify for the All-Ireland semi-finals.

Teams

Non-Leinster teams

On 30 September 2017, 72% of delegates at GAA Special Congress voted in favour of allowing Galway into the Leinster Championship along with any Ulster teams – as of agreed by the Ulster and Leinster Councils.

Venues

History

Leinster Championship matches have always been played on a home and away basis whereby every second meeting between teams is played at the home venue of one of them. All of the current teams have home and away agreements, however, Antrim and Galway are not permitted to use their home grounds because they are outside the province of Leinster.

Attendances

Stadium attendances are a significant source of regular income for the Leinster Council and for the teams involved.

Final

The venue for the final also comes under the terms of the individual home and away agreements between the teams involved, however, on some occasions a neutral venue was used. The attendance at the 2017 Leinster final was 6,089.

Managers

Managers in the Leinster Championship are involved in the day-to-day running of the team, including the training, team selection, and sourcing of players from the club championships. Their influence varies from county-to-county and is related to the individual county boards. The manager is assisted by a team of two or three selectors and an extensive backroom team consisting of various coaches. The under-20 team manager also works closely with the senior team manager due to an overlap of players on both teams. Prior to the development of the concept of a manager in the 1970s, teams were usually managed by a team of selectors with one member acting as chairman.

Trophy and medals

At the end of the Leinster final, the winning team is presented with a trophy. The Seán Robbins Cup is held by the winning team until the following year's final. Traditionally, the presentation is made at a special rostrum in the stand where GAA and political dignitaries and special guests view the match.

The cup is decorated with ribbons in the colours of the winning team. During the game the cup actually has both teams' sets of ribbons attached and the runners-up ribbons are removed before the presentation. The winning captain accepts the cup on behalf of his team before giving a short speech. Individual members of the winning team then have an opportunity to come to the rostrum to lift the cup.

In accordance with GAA rules, the Leinster Council awards up to twenty-four gold medals to the winners of the Leinster final.

Sponsorship
Since 2003, the Leinster Championship has been sponsored. The sponsor has usually been able to determine the championship's sponsorship name.

Results

Summaries

Performances by counties

Records

Final

Team

Most titles: 26:
 Kilkenny (1968, 1974, 1975, 1976, 1977, 1980, 1981, 1982, 1984, 1985, 1988, 1990, 1993, 1994, 1995, 1998, 1999, 2003, 2004, 2005, 2006, 2008, 2009, 2012, 2017. 2019)
Most consecutive title wins: 4:
Kilkenny (1974, 1975, 1976, 1977)
Kilkenny (2003, 2004, 2005, 2006)
Most appearances in a final: 36:
Kilkenny (1968, 1969, 1970, 1971, 1974, 1975, 1976, 1977, 1979, 1980, 1981, 1982, 1984, 1985, 1988, 1989, 1990, 1991, 1992, 1993, 1994, 1995, 1998, 1999, 2000, 2003, 2004, 2005, 2006, 2008, 2009, 2012, 2013, 2015, 2017, 2019)

Teams

By decade

The most successful team of each decade, judged by number of championship titles, is as follows:

 1960s: 4 for Wexford (1964-65-66-69)
 1970s: 4 each for Wexford (1970-71-73-79) and Kilkenny (1974-75-76-77)
 1980s: 6 for Kilkenny (1980-81-82-84-85-88)
 1990s: 6 for Kilkenny (1990-93-94-95-98-99)
 2000s: 6 for Kilkenny (2003-04-05-06-08-09)
 2010s: 3 each for Dublin (2010-11-16), Kilkenny (2012-17-19) and Wexford (2013-14-15)

Gaps

Top five longest gaps between successive championship titles:
 35 years: Dublin (1972-2007)
 11 years: Offaly (1978-1989)
 11 years: Wexford (2002-2013)
 9 years: Wexford (1987-1996)
 8 years: Offaly (1992-2000)

Top scorers

By year

In a single game

In finals

References

 4
Lein